Josef Winckler (7 July 1881, Bentlage, Rheine – 29 January 1966, Bensberg, Bergisch Gladbach) was a German writer, best known for his 1923 comic novel The Mad Bomberg, which was turned into films in 1932 and 1957. One of his other popular novels was Doctor Eisenbart (1929), based on the life of Johann Andreas Eisenbarth.

References

Further reading 
 Rhys W. Williams, Stephen Parker, Colin Riordan (ed.) German Writers and the Cold War 1945–61. Manchester University Press, 1992.

External links 
 
 

1881 births
1966 deaths
People from Rheine
People from the Province of Westphalia
20th-century German novelists
German male novelists
20th-century German male writers